Tung Tau is one of the 25 constituencies in the Wong Tai Sin District in Hong Kong. The constituency returns one district councillor to the Wong Tai Sin District Council, with an election every four years.

The constituency has an estimated population of 16,884.

Councillors represented

Election results

2010s

References

Wong Tai Sin
San Po Kong
Constituencies of Hong Kong
Constituencies of Wong Tai Sin District Council
1991 establishments in Hong Kong
Constituencies established in 1991